Jalan Permatang Badak, Federal Route 229 (formerly Pahang State Route C173), is a federal road in Pahang, Malaysia.  The Kilometre Zero (KM0) of the Federal Route 229 starts at Gambang-Kuantan Highway junctions.

Features

At most sections, the Federal Route 229 was built under the JKR R5 road standard, allowing maximum speed limit of up to 90 km/h.

List of junctions

References

Malaysian Federal Roads